Burwood railway station is a heritage-listed railway station located on the Main Suburban line in the Sydney suburb of Burwood in the Municipality of Burwood local government area of New South Wales, Australia. The station is served by Sydney Trains T9 Northern line and T2 Inner West & Leppington line services.

History

Burwood
Parramatta Road was first created in 1791, a vital land (cf water) artery between Sydney Cove and Rose Hill's settlement and crops. Liverpool Road opened in 1814 as Governor Macquarie's Great South Road. Its winding route reflects pre-existing land grant boundaries. To Burwood's north over Parramatta was Longbottom Government Farm, staffed by convicts. Commissioner Bigge recorded how valuable timber (ironbark) was cut and sawn on the spot, conveyed to Sydney in boats by the river. "Charcoal for the forges and foundries is likewise prepared here" he noted.

Two grants were critical on Burwood's clay: Captain Thomas Rowley's Burwood Farm estate and William Faithful's  grant to its south in Enfield covered most of modern Burwood. Rowley, adjutant of the NSW Corps, named it after the farm he'd lived on in Cornwall. 1799 and subsequent grants brought it to  but he continued to live at Kingston Farm in Newtown until his death in 1806. He'd bought some of the first Spanish merinos brought from the Cape Colony in 1797, others being sold to Macarthur, Marsden & Cox. The southern boundary of his farm was approximately Woodside Avenue & Fitzroy Street.

Under Rowley's will, the estate passed to his three underage children executors Dr Harris & Major Johnstone were both involved in the 1808 Bligh rebellion and returned to England for the court martial. Governor Macquarie appointed Thomas Moore as guardian and executor. In 1812, he wrongfully auctioned the estate. It was bought by Sydney businessman Alexander Riley. He's believed to have built Burwood Villa in 1814 (perhaps on older (1797) foundations of Rowley's shepherd's cottage) and lived here until departing for England in 1817. In 1824, Joseph Lycett described the estate.  had been cleared for pasture. Lycett in Views of Australia described "a garden of 4 acres in full cultivation, containing upwards of three hundred Trees, bearing the following choice fruits, viz. The Orange, Citron, Lemon, Pomegranate, Loquat, Guava, Peaches, Nectarines, Apricots, Apples, Pears, the Cherry, Plums, Figs, Chestnuts, Almonds, Medlars, Quinces; with abundance of Raspberries, Strawberries, and the finest Melons. &c;".

Until the 1830s, Burwood consisted of a few inns along the highways and 2 or 3 huge, undeveloped estates within the next 20 years these began to break up, attracting settlers and encouraging the growth of embryo villages at Burwood & Enfield. Riley died in 1833 and Rowley's children, now of age, started legal proceedings and regained possession of the  estate. It was divided between Thomas jnr., John, John Lucas* and Henry Biggs. In 1834, Burwood estate was held by John Lucas, husband of Thomas's daughter Mary Rowley), who divided  of his  into small allotments for sale. Streets such as Webb, Lucas Road, Wentworth Road and Strathfield's The Boulevarde reflect the boundaries of these subdivisions/estates.

Faithful was a private in the NSW Corps: discharged in 1799 he became Captain Foveaux's farm manager, and this connection got him the grant. The government retained a right to build a road through it (doing so in 1815: Liverpool or the Great South Road), and to cut "such timber as may be deemed fit for naval purposes" – the area was thick with tall ironbark. Faithful exchanged it in 1815. Alexander Riley bought his 200 acres north of the new road incorporating it into his Burwood estate. This was jointly owned by the Rowley family after 1833 and had no streets across it, only a few tracks.

Despite opening up of the Rowley estate, there was little settlement in Burwood between the two highways before 1860. Sydney Railway Company opened the first railway line to Parramatta in 1855. Burwood "station" (just west of Ashfield station, one of the first stations) was a wooden platform near a level crossing over the grassy track that was Neich's Lane* (later Burwood Road). This was beside "the newly laid out township of Cheltenham". Speedy transport meant subdivision and consolidation followed, filling out the area. Burwood's biggest growth spurt was between 1874 & 1900 (Burwood's population was, respectively: 1200–7400, an increase not matched since. *1835 maps show this as the only track between Parramatta / Liverpool Roads in Burwood.

Between 1889 and 1918, Australia's population swelled from three to five million triggering an urgent need for housing. Suburban spread was greatly assisted by expansion of the public transport system of trams, ferries and trams, which formed a well-integrated pre-car transport system.

Railway Station Group

The original Burwood station opened on 26 September 1855 at a site at ground level on the west side of Burwood Road. The station was relocated in 1892 to the current location on the east side of Burwood Road and along Railway Parade when the line was quadruplicated. The line through Burwood was sextuplicated in 1922, and a second subway was constructed at the eastern end of the station. This subway closed after 1985.

Despite opening up of the Rowley estate there was little settlement in Burwood between the two highways before 1860. Sydney Railway Company opened the first railway line to Parramatta in 1855. Burwood "station" (just west of Ashfield station, one of the first stations) was a wooden platform near a level crossing over the grassy track that was Neich's Lane* (later Burwood Rd). This was beside "the newly laid out township of Cheltenham". Speedy transport meant subdivision and consolidation followed, filling out the area. Burwood's biggest growth spurt was between 1874 & 1900 (Burwood's population was, respectively: 1200–7400, an increase not matched since.

In 1869, a post office was situated at the railway station. Postal services were previously conducted through general stores. In 1886, a new building was erected at the railway station (this remains today) and in 1892, the present day Post Office, designed by W. L. Vernon, was opened.

The surviving building at No. 1 Railway Parade dates from 1886 and was built by the Railway Department fronting the down platform of the then Burwood Station as a Post & Telegraph Office. It survived in its original form until , when approximately 3/4 of the structure were removed from the southern side facing Railway Parade. It is the last remaining visible fabric of the second Burwood Railway Station which occupied the site immediately west of Burwood Road from 1878 to 1892. Its location coincides approximately with the site of an earlier station building which was erected in 1862 and demolished in 1878. The building is a rare surviving example of a purpose-built post office dating from the years when this facility was often closely associated with the spread and development of the state's railway network... Documentary evidence (historic measured surveys) show that the present building has a different footprint from that standing in 1890 and 1894. An examination of the fabric of the building provides clues to explaining that discrepancy. The present building was erected in 1886, not c.1880 or 1883 as claimed by others. It was purpose built by the Railway Department as a Post and Telegraph Office. Some time after 1894, the building was adapted for a new use as a Railway Goods Office; it may never have been used as a parcels office, even though it was so-named. The present building, and the associated crane and weighbridge, are considered to have local or possibly regional heritage significance.

The four surviving elements in the Burwood Goods Yard – pillar crane, weighbridge, office and platform – are physical reminders of a typical small suburban goods yard at the turn of the 20th century. Few traces of such elements survive at other yards, most if not all of which, such as Petersham and Ashfield, have been closed to goods traffic.

The surviving elements have the ability to be used in assisting in the interpretation of the many changes that have taken place to Burwood Railway Station since the opening of the first platform in 1855.

In April 1988, the goods siding to the south of the station was removed.

In 2009–10, the station underwent a significant refurbishment to address high levels of congestion at times of high patronage. Work included an expanded concourse with extra ticket barriers, new toilets and lifts to the platforms. The upgrade was completed in mid 2010.

Platforms and services

Description 
The complex comprises a brick in subway booking office, completed in 1892; and a brick parcels office that previously served as a railway post office, erected .

Other structures include a brick pedestrian subway and steps; a  jib crane; and a weighbridge, from Goulburn.

Transport links
Transdev NSW operates one route from Burwood station:
M90: to Liverpool station via Bankstown station

Transit Systems operate 16 routes via Burwood station:
407: to Strathfield station via Homebush West
408: to Rookwood
410: Hurstville to Marsfield via Campsie
415: Campsie to Chiswick
418: to Sydenham via Ashfield and Marrickville
420: Westfield Burwood to Mascot via Sydney Airport.
458: to Ryde
461X: to The Domain 
461N: to Hyde Park Night service
464: Ashfield station to Mortlake
466: to Cabarita Park
490: Drummoyne to Hurstville
492: Drummoyne to Rockdale
526: to Olympic Park wharf and Rhodes
530: to Chatswood station via Drummoyne & Lane Cove

Burwood station is served by three NightRide routes:
N50: Liverpool station to Town Hall station
N60: Fairfield station to Town Hall station
N61: Carlingford station to Town Hall station

Heritage listing 
As at 24 November 2000, Burwood is a major suburban site with some significant structures dating from the 1880 period when the railway crossed Burwood Rd by a level crossing. The small former railway post office is a rare surviving example of this type of structure. The Parcels Office is also of significance because it shows the original earlier platform alignment on which the tracks were located and the changes with the upgrading of the line through that area in 1892.

Burwood railway station was listed on the New South Wales State Heritage Register on 2 April 1999 having satisfied the following criteria.

The place possesses uncommon, rare or endangered aspects of the cultural or natural history of New South Wales.

This item is assessed as historically rare. This item is assessed as scientifically rare. This item is assessed as arch. rare. This item is assessed as socially rare.

See also 

List of Sydney Trains railway stations

References

Bibliography

Attribution

External links

Burwood station details Transport for New South Wales
Burwood Station Public Transport Map Transport for NSW

Easy Access railway stations in Sydney
Railway stations in Sydney
Railway stations in Australia opened in 1855
Railway stations in Australia opened in 1892
Burwood, New South Wales
New South Wales State Heritage Register
Articles incorporating text from the New South Wales State Heritage Register
Main Suburban railway line